"Work in Progress" is a song written and recorded by American country music artist Alan Jackson.  It was released in June 2002 as the third single from his album Drive.  It peaked at number 3 on the United States Billboard Hot Country Singles & Tracks chart, and number 35 on the United States Billboard Hot 100 chart.

Content
The narrator tells his significant other to be patient with him because he is a "work in progress".

Chart performance
"Work in Progress" debuted at number 52 on the United States Billboard Hot Country Singles & Tracks for the week of June 29, 2002.

Year-end charts

References

2002 singles
Alan Jackson songs
Songs written by Alan Jackson
Song recordings produced by Keith Stegall
Arista Nashville singles
2002 songs